Alan Tudge (born 24 February 1971) is a former Australian politician. He was a Liberal Party member of the House of Representatives between 2010 and 2023. He was a cabinet minister in the Morrison government from 2019 to 2022.

Tudge grew up in Pakenham, Victoria. Before entering politics he was a management consultant with the Boston Consulting Group and deputy director of the Cape York Institute (2006–2009). He was elected to federal parliament in 2010, representing the Victorian seat of Aston. Tudge became a parliamentary secretary after the 2013 election. He was a government minister from 2016 to 2022 under Malcolm Turnbull and Scott Morrison, serving as Minister for Human Services (2016–2017), Citizenship and Multicultural Affairs (2017–2018), Population, Cities and Urban Infrastructure (2018–2020), and Education and Youth (2020–2022). During his time as Minister for Human Services, he oversaw the implementation of the unlawful Robodebt debt recovery scheme. In 2019 it was identified he has dyscalculia. He took leave from the ministry in 2021 following allegations of bullying from a former staffer with whom he had an extramarital affair. After the Coalition's defeat at the 2022 election, he was appointed to Peter Dutton's shadow cabinet. Tudge resigned from parliament on 17 February 2023.

Early life
Tudge was born on 24 February 1971 in Pakenham, Victoria. His parents were veterinarians who met at the University of Edinburgh in Scotland and arrived in Australia as Ten Pound Poms. He was born a British citizen by descent, but renounced his dual citizenship before standing for parliament in 2010. His mother was born in Scotland and his father in England, while his maternal grandfather was born in Canada.

Tudge's parents separated when he was around six years old, after which he was raised by his mother on a small farm near Pakenham. He attended a local primary school, then completed his secondary education at Haileybury, Melbourne, graduating in 1988. Tudge attended the University of Melbourne, completing the degrees of Bachelor of Arts and Bachelor of Laws (Hons.). He served as president of the Melbourne University Student Union, replacing Andrew Landeryou, in what he described as "the first time a non-Left president had won for many, many years".

Tudge was one of seven Liberal MPs in the 46th Parliament of Australia who have obtained degrees at an Oxbridge or Ivy League university, the others being Josh Frydenberg, Angus Taylor, Andrew Laming, Dave Sharma, Greg Hunt and Paul Fletcher.  Tudge obtained an MBA from Harvard University.

Career
Tudge worked as a management consultant with the Boston Consulting Group (BCG) from 1996 to 2001. He was initially based in Melbourne and later in New York, and during this time completed a Master of Business Administration (MBA) at Harvard University. He was also seconded to indigenous leader Noel Pearson's Cape York Institute through Jawun, as the organisation's first corporate secondee.

In 2002, Tudge became a senior adviser to federal education minister Brendan Nelson. He later worked for foreign minister Alexander Downer. Tudge later rejoined the Cape York Institute as deputy director from 2006 to 2009. He was a founding board member of Teach For Australia, established in 2009 by his former BCG colleague Melodie Potts Rosevear. He subsequently ran his own policy advisory firm from 2009 until his election to parliament.

Political career
Tudge joined the Liberal Party in 2002 and was the convenor of its Education Policy Forum. In September 2009, he won preselection for the Division of Aston as one of 11 candidates, defeating Neil Angus on the final ballot. He retained Aston for the Liberals at the 2010 federal election, succeeding the retiring MP Chris Pearce.

Tudge is a member of the National Right faction of the Liberal Party.

Abbott government (2013–2015)
Following the 2013 federal election and the formation of the Abbott Ministry, Tudge was appointed as parliamentary secretary to Prime Minister Tony Abbott. On the day of the 2015 leadership spill which saw Abbott replaced by Malcolm Turnbull, he publicly described himself as "a very strong supporter of the prime minister". He was nonetheless retained as assistant minister to Turnbull and also made an assistant minister to social services minister Christian Porter.

Turnbull government (2015–2018)
In February 2016 Tudge was appointed Minister for Human Services in the Turnbull Government. He oversaw the implementation of the Cashless Welfare Card, a scheme by which 80% of welfare payments are placed on a debit card. By 2016, Tudge was seen to be a rising star in the Liberal government. 

Following a cabinet reshuffle, Tudge was appointed Minister for Citizenship and Multicultural Affairs in December 2017. During the 2018 Liberal leadership spills, he was one of a number of ministers to tender their resignation to Turnbull; however, his was not immediately accepted. He reportedly voted for Peter Dutton against Scott Morrison in the second vote.

Morrison government (2018–2022)
Tudge was retained in the First Morrison Ministry as Minister for Cities, Urban Infrastructure and Population. He stated his support for a "Bigger Australia". After the 2019 election he was elevated to cabinet. In December 2019 he was additionally appointed as the acting Minister for Immigration, Citizenship, Migrant Services and Multicultural Affairs, due to David Coleman taking indefinite leave. Tudge was appointed Minister for Education and Youth in December 2020, replacing Dan Tehan as part of a cabinet reshuffle caused by the retirement of Mathias Cormann.

In Opposition (2022–2023) 
In 2022, Prime Minister Scott Morrison and the LNP were voted out at the 2022 Australian federal election. During the election, Tudge had a 7-point two-party preferred swing against him, but still managed to hold the seat by 5 points. The election marked the second time since Tudge was elected that the Liberals sat in opposition. Following the election, Tudge was named in the Shadow Cabinet as the Shadow Minister of Education under the leadership of Peter Dutton but was exiled due to the on-going inquiry into the Robodebt scheme.

Tudge announced his forthcoming resignation in parliament on 9 February 2023, and submitted his resignation on 17 February 2023.

Controversies
In June 2017 Tudge, and Liberal Party colleagues Greg Hunt and Michael Sukkar, faced the possibility of being prosecuted for contempt of court after they made public statements criticising the sentencing decisions of two senior judges while the government was awaiting their ruling on a related appeal. They avoided prosecution by, eventually, making an unconditional apology to the Victorian Court of Appeal. Conviction could have resulted in their expulsion from the parliament under Constitution s 44(ii) and, as a result, the government losing its one-seat majority in the House of Representatives.

In March 2020, the Administrative Appeals Tribunal ordered that an Afghan asylum seeker who had previously been a part of the Afghan National Army be granted a temporary protection visa. Tudge, who was Acting Immigration Minister at the time, instantly appealed against the AAT's decision in the Federal Court, which failed. However, during the 6-day appeal process, the asylum seeker had been kept in the detention centre. Six months later, the Federal Court found that Tudge had "engaged in conduct which can only be described as criminal" and had deprived the asylum seeker of his liberty, which has prompted calls for Tudge's resignation.  That decision was itself set aside on appeal, and the matter referred back to a differently constituted sitting of the Administrative Appeals Tribunal

Affair and bullying allegations
In November 2020, Tudge's former press secretary Rachelle Miller revealed on a broadcast of Four Corners that they had engaged in an affair. Tudge subsequently released a statement on Facebook confirming the affair and that it led to the end of his marriage. In the same broadcast, Miller described Tudge's opposition to same-sex marriage, based on his support for "traditional" marriage, as hypocritical. She later also accused him of bullying and intimidation, saying in a complaint: "He would often ask me to go to dinner or drinks at the end of a long day on the road. I often felt like I didn’t have much choice or couldn’t say no because he was my boss". After further allegations of abuse by Miller in December 2021, Tudge stood aside from the ministry on 2 December while the claims were investigated. In March 2022, the review cleared Tudge of breaking any rules. Despite the review being in his favour, Tudge decided not to return to the cabinet and said he would resign formally as minister. He claimed that the decision was "in the interests of his family and his own well-being and in order to focus on his re-election as the Member for Aston". However, it was confirmed in April 2022 that Tudge had retained his ministerial title, but was officially "on leave".

Election results

Personal life
Tudge and his wife, Teri Etchells, had three children. Their 20-year relationship ended in 2017, a year after the birth of their third child, as a result of Tudge's extramarital affair.

References

External links
 Alan Tudge they vote for YOU

1971 births
Living people
People educated at Haileybury (Melbourne)
Abbott Government
Turnbull Government
Liberal Party of Australia members of the Parliament of Australia
Members of the Australian House of Representatives
Members of the Australian House of Representatives for Aston
Harvard Business School alumni
21st-century Australian politicians
Melbourne Law School alumni
Government ministers of Australia
People from Melbourne
People who lost British citizenship
People with acquired British citizenship
Australian people of English descent
Australian people of Scottish descent
Australian people of Canadian descent
Morrison Government
Australian management consultants